The Little Rock Boys Club, now the Storer Building, is a historic commercial building at 8th and Scott Streets in downtown Little Rock, Arkansas.  It is a two-story brick Colonial Revival building, with a third floor under a recessed mansard roof with gabled dormers.  The brick is laid in Flemish bond, and the main entrance is framed by stone pilasters and topped by a fanlight window and entablature.  The building was designed by Thompson, Sanders and Ginocchio, and was built in 1930.  It now houses professional offices.

The building was listed on the National Register of Historic Places in 1982.

See also
National Register of Historic Places listings in Little Rock, Arkansas

References

Clubhouses on the National Register of Historic Places in Arkansas
Colonial Revival architecture in Arkansas
Buildings and structures completed in 1930
Buildings and structures in Little Rock, Arkansas
National Register of Historic Places in Little Rock, Arkansas